Rugby sevens at the Pan American Games was held for the first time at the 2011 Pan American Games. On July 11, 2007, the Pan American Sports Organization (PASO), announced that rugby sevens would be added to the list of sports that will be played at future Pan American Games, after a vote by the organization's general assembly. Women's rugby sevens was later added to the program for the 2015 Games.

Men's medal table

Men's tournament

Participating nations

Women's medal table

Women's tournament

Participating nations

Combined medal table

References

 
rugby sevens
Rugby sevens competitions in South America
Rugby sevens competitions in North America
Rugby sevens at multi-sport events